Sudai is a village in the Madhubani District in Mithila, north Bihar, India. 

Notable people from Sudai include Jagannath Mishra, Member of Parliament of the 5th Lok Sabha (1971–1977).

See also 
 Madhubani, India
 Bihar, India
 India

Villages in Madhubani district